Clemens Erwein Heinrich Karl Bonaventura Freiherr von und zu Franckenstein (14 July 1875 – 19 August 1942) was a German opera composer who is studying in Vienna, Austria, and later in Munich, Germany, with Ludwig Thuille and at the Hoch Conservatory in Frankfurt with Iwan Knorr. After a visit to th,e USA he conducted the Moody-Manners Opera Company, acted from 1902–1907 as opera conductor in London, then worked at the court theatres of Wiesbaden and Berlin, until the court theaters were abolished after the First World War. He was the last royal general director of the Bayerische Staatsoper in Munich (1912–1918 and 1924–1934) and the only one who exercised this office twice. He produced the Munich Opera Festival through 1934 when he was forced out by Nazi prohibitions.

Franckenstein was born in Wiesentheid, Germany to Karl Freiherr von und zu Franckenstein (1831–1898) and Elma Gräfin von Schönborn-Wiesentheid (184composerHis brother was Austrian Ambassador to England, Georg von und zu Franckenstein (1878–1953).  Georg's son, actor Clement von Franckenstein (1944–2019), was his nephew.

Franckenstein died in Hechendorf am Pilsensee, Oberbayern, Germany at age 67.

Stage works
Griseldis. Oper in 3 Akten (Libretto: Oskar Mayer)
Fortunatus. Oper in 3 Akten (Libretto : Jakob Wassermann)
Rahab. Oper in 1 Akt (Libretto: Oskar Mayer)
Die Biene. Pantomime (Libretto: Hugo von Hofmannsthal)
Li-Tai-Pe, der Kaisers Dichter. Oper in 3 Akten, Op. 43 (1920) (Libretto: Rudolf Lothar)

Orchestral works
Rhapsodie für Orchester op. 47.Variations on a theme by MeyerbeerDance suiteSerenadePraeludiumSymphonic suiteDas alte LiedFour dancesFestival PreludeReferences

Further reading
McCredie, Andrew D., Clemens von Franckenstein (1875–1942). A German Associate of the English Frankfort Group. The Orchesterlied and his settings from Hans Bethge's "Die chinesische Flöte", in Miscellanea Musicologica [Adelaide Studies in Musicology, Vol. 13], 1988.
McCredie, Andrew D., Clemens von Franckenstein, Tutzing: Schneider, 1992 (in German) [Series:  Komponisten in Bayern, Vol. 26], .
McCredie, Andrew D., The comparative case histories of Karl Amadeus Hartmann, Clemens von Frankenstein and Paul von Klenau as variant examples of Innere Emigration: Problems and issues for German music historiography of the period 1918-1945. in: Glazba, ideje i drustvo: Svecani zbornik za Ivana Supicica/Music, ideas, and society: Essays in honour of Ivan Supicic, Zagreb, Croatia: Hrvatsko Muzikolosko Drustvo 1993, pp. 215-235 (in English).
Landfester, Ulrike, Briefwechsel mit Clemens von Franckenstein'' [The correspondence with Clemens von Franckenstein: 1894-1928.], Freiburg im Breisgau: Rombach 1998, .

1875 births
1942 deaths
20th-century classical composers
Barons of Germany
German opera composers
Male opera composers
German opera directors
Hoch Conservatory alumni
Pupils of Iwan Knorr
German male classical composers
20th-century German composers
20th-century German male musicians